The Flaming Urge (1953) is an American crime film directed by Harold Ericson.

Plot
A young man arrives in the small town of Monroe, Michigan where he finds a job in a department store. However he has an apparently irresistible urge to follow and observe fires. When there is a spate of arson attacks on the town, he becomes chief suspect.

Cast
Harold Lloyd Jr. as Tom Smith
Cathy Downs as Charlotte Cruickshank
Byron Foulger as A. Horace Pender
Jonathan Hale as Mr. Chalmers
Bob Hughes as Frank
Florence Lake as Mrs. Binger
Herbert Rawlinson as Herb, fire chief
Pierre Watkin as Albert Cruickshank
Barbara Woodell as Mrs. Cruickshank
Johnny Duncan as Ralph Jarvis

Soundtrack

External links

1953 films
1953 crime films
American crime films
American black-and-white films
Films directed by Harold Ericson
Films scored by Raoul Kraushaar
1950s English-language films
1950s American films